Fantastico (Фантастико) is a Bulgarian supermarket chain founded in 1991. Fantastico is part of the retail sector and primarily sells foodstuffs. The first supermarket was opened at 72 Oborischte street. Since then the company began expanding mostly in the capital of Bulgaria.

, the company operates 45 stores in Sofia and 3 outside Sofia, including a do-it-yourself store and eight cash and carry hypermarkets. Although most Fantastico stores are in the capital, the chain is the main competitor of international chains like Billa in the country. In 2007, Fantastico opened its first supermarket outside the capital, in the town of Kyustendil, in south-western Bulgaria. Nowadays, there are Fantastico supermarkets in Sofia, Kyustendil, Pernik and Elin Pelin. The chain currently employs more than 3,100 people. The holding is called Van Holding and is privately owned by Valeri Nikolov, according to Bulgaria's commercial register data.

All stores are equipped with ATMs and POS terminals for international payments national debit and credit cards. They offer a rich variety of goods with approximately 20,000 types of products, which include bio foods, drinks, diabetic products, culinary stands, cooked dishes, bakery products, meat delicatessen and freshly baked bread.

References

External links
Fantastico website (in Bulgarian and English)

Supermarkets of Bulgaria
Retail companies established in 1991